The Baru language  may be:
Bru language, a Mon–Khmer dialect continuum spoken by the Bru people of mainland Southeast Asia
Morafa language or Asaro'o, one of the Finisterre languages of Papua New Guinea